Konstantinos Nikolopoulos may refer to:

 Konstantinos Nikolopoulos (composer) (1786–1841), Greek composer
 Konstantinos Nikolopoulos (fencer) (1890–1980), Greek Olympic fencer, mayor of Athens, 1951–1955
 Konstantinos Nikolopoulos (footballer, born 1993), Greek footballer
 Konstantinos Nikolopoulos (footballer, born 2002), Greek footballer
 Konstantinos Nikolopoulos (water polo), Greek Olympic water polo player
 Konstantinos Nikolopoulos (neuroscientist), 2019 laureate in Blavatnik Awards